Christopher Kennedy (born in London, England 15 July 1954) is a British music editor, photographer and sculptor who moved to the United States in 1985.

Kennedy spent many years as a music editor, working on over 70 Hollywood feature films in Los Angeles, California. He was nominated for one Emmy Award in 2009, as part of the sound editing team on The Courageous Heart of Irena Sendler, and three Golden Reel Sound Awards for “Unfaithful,” “De-Lovely” and “Rameses”, and collaborated with composer Jan AP Kaczmarek on the Oscar winning score for the movie "Finding Neverland".

Kennedy moved to Bucks County Pennsylvania in 2002 to concentrate on fine art photography. He developed a technique which he calls Photo Luminism, after noticing an effect created when taking pictures of harbor lights in 2008. The images are created entirely in-camera in a single exposure and with no creative post additions. The abstracted images are hot-printed onto specially treated metal, a process that maximises the appearance of light emanating from within the image, on an entirely flat and mirror-like surface. Commissions for his work can be seen in exclusive hotels around the world.

In 2016 Kennedy's proposal for the New Hope Arts Outdoor Sculpture Contest, "Exhibitionist," based on three of his Photo Luminism images, was a winner and was subsequently built in opaque fiberglass by Kennedy and his partner Mark Hutzky. The larger than life three-piece sculpture is internally illuminated by almost 2000 animated LEDs. It was installed in New Hope PA in October 2019.

Family
Kennedy comes from a family of artists. His great grandfather was T. C. Farrer, a Ruskinian painter, who co-founded the American Pre-Raphaelite movement called Society for the Advancement of Truth in Art. Kennedy's nephew is painter Damian Elwes and his sister is the interior designer Tessa Kennedy. His cousins, sisters Venetia Epler and Daphne Huntington, were Californian artists whose work is represented in several permanent collections and at Forest Lawn, Covina Hills CA and Woodlawn Memorial Park, Orlando FL.

References

  Filmography on New York Times
 Christopher Kennedy on IMDB 
 Filmography on Turner Classic Movies

British editors
American photographers
Living people
British emigrants to the United States
English male sculptors
English male voice actors
1954 births